Varighedu is a village in West Godavari district in the state of Andhra Pradesh in India.

Demographics
 India census, Varighedu has a population of 4133 of which 2063 are males while 2070 are females. The average sex ratio of Varighedu village is 1003. The child population is 385, which makes up 9.32% of the total population of the village, with sex ratio 1139. In 2011, the literacy rate of Varighedu village was 84.56% when compared to 71.00% of Andhra Pradesh.

See also 
 Eluru

References 

Villages in West Godavari district